Galtee Rovers GAA, also called Galtee Rovers—St. Pecaun's is a Gaelic Athletic Association club located in the village of Bansha on the National Primary Route N24 in the shadow of the Galtee Mountains in west County Tipperary, Ireland. The club, founded in 1885, represents the parish of Bansha & Kilmoyler and enters gaelic football and hurling teams in the West Tipperary and Tipperary championships. The Club grounds - Canon Hayes Park - are named in honour of the founder of Muntir na Tíre, Very Rev. John Canon Hayes, Parish Priest of Bansha & Kilmoyler (1946–57), who was patron of the Club during his pastorship. The Club pavilion is named 'The McGrath Centre' in honour of two club members, the late John & Geraldine McGrath who died  on New Year's Day, 1 January 2000.   John Moloney, referee of six All-Ireland Senior Finals, was President of the Galtee Rovers Club at the time of his death on 6 October 2006. In addition to his work at national level in the Gaelic Athletic Association, at club level he coached and organised the juvenile and under-age players for nearly 50 years.

Galtee Rovers is a traditional football club, however in modern times it has enjoyed a hurling renaissance from the late 1990s through the early years of the 21st century. The Club was one of the few dual (hurling and football) senior clubs for five years from 2001 to 2006. However, it lost its senior hurling status after defeat in the West Divisional and County championships in 2006.  The club's main focus at senior level for the immediate future is expected to be in football, while continuing to compete in the Intermediate hurling championship. The club's endeavours in football were rewarded in 2008 when Rovers regained the County Tipperary Senior Football Championship after an interval of 27 years by defeating neighbouring Cahir, 0-7 to 0-5 in the final played at Cashel on Sunday, 26 October 2008.

In 2003, the club won all six major championships in West Tipperary, i.e., Senior Hurling & Football; Under-21(grade A) Hurling & Football and Minor (grade A) Hurling & Football.

Honours

Football

 Tipperary Senior Football Championship Winners: (6): 1949, 1950, 1976, 1980, 1981, 2008.
 Tipperary Junior Football Championship Winners (1): 1946
 Tipperary Minor Football Championship Winners (1): 1998, 2016 (with Golden)2022.
 South Tipperary Senior Football Championship Winners (2): 1912, 1915
 West Tipperary Senior Football Championship Winners (26): 1947, 1949, 1950, 1951, 1952, 1953, 1954, 1962, 1963, 1974, 1975, 1976, 1979, 1983, 1985, 1989, 1991, 1999, 2000, 2001, 2002, 2003, 2004, 2008, 2014, 2018.
 West Tipperary Senior Football League (O'Donoghue Cup) Winners (8): 1973, 1977, 1978, 1980, 1990, 1994, 1995, 2005.
 West Tipperary Junior Football (A) Championship Winners (5): 1935, 1941, 1943, 1946, 1959.
Tipperary Junior B Football Championship Winners 2007
 West Tipperary Junior Football (B) Championship Winners (6): 1997, 1998, 2002, 2004, 2007, 2015.
 West Tipperary Minor (A) Football Championship Winners (7): 1953, 1961 (with Golden), 1962 (with Golden), 1993, 1998, 2001, 2003, 2014, 2015 (with Golden), 2016 (with Golden)2022
 Tipperary Under-21 (A) Football Championship (1) 1975
 West Tipperary Under-21 (A) Football Championship (11) 1974, 1975, 1976, 1978, 1999, 2000, 2001, 2002, 2003, 2004, 2015 (with Emly)
 West Tipperary Under-21 (B) Football Championship (1) 1988 2022
 ‘’’West u19 Football Championship’’’ 2022
 ‘’’County u19 B Football Champions’’’ 2022

Hurling

 Tipperary Intermediate Hurling Championship Winners (1): 2001.
 Tipperary Intermediate Hurling League Winners (1): 2007.
 Tipperary Junior A Hurling Championship Winners (1): 1999.
 West Tipperary Senior Hurling Championship Winners (1): 2003
 West Tipperary Intermediate Hurling Championship Winners (6): 2000, 2001, 2007, 2008, 2009, 2010
 West Tipperary Junior (A) Hurling Championship Winners (9): 1940, 1946, 1960, 1969, 1971, 1973, 1980, 1997, 1999,2021
 West Tipperary Junior (B) Hurling Championship Winners (1): 2000.
 South Tipperary Senior Hurling Championship Winners (1) : 1923
 West Tipperary Under-21 (A) Hurling Championship (3) 2002, 2003, 2004
 West Tipperary Under-21 (B) Hurling Championship (1) 1998
 West Tipperary Under-21 (C) Hurling Championship (1) 2019
 West Tipperary Minor (A) Hurling Championship (3) 2001, 2003, 2013 (with Éire Óg Annacarty)
 West Tipperary Minor (B) Hurling Championship (4) 1985, 1993, 1997, 1999

Early history
The Galtee Rovers Club was first affiliated to the Tipperary County Board of the GAA in 1885. The current parish club was preceded in earlier times by Bansha, St. Pecaun's and Kilmoyler.  The latter won the South Tipperary Senior Hurling Championship in 1923. For most of its existence, the Club was known as Galtee Rovers and this name can be found in the annals of the period 1899/1900. A hiatus occurred in the 1940s when a team was formed in Kilmoyler which competed in the West Tipperary junior football championship for a few seasons, however a closing of ranks took place in time for the 1946 championships when, for one season only, the Club was named Galteee Rovers - St. Pecaun. In 1947, the Club restored its ancient name of Galtee Rovers while adopting St. Pecaun of Toureen as its Patron and Protector, a solution which has endured since then.

One of the Club leaders in its formative years in the 1880s was Mr. John Cullinane, M.P. who was a native of Bansha and represented County Tipperary as a Nationalist member of Parliament at Westminster from 1900 to 1918. Mr. Cullinane refereed the first All-Ireland Senior Football Final at Clonskeagh, Dublin between the Limerick Commercials and the Dundalk Young Irelands of Louth in 1887 and was the advance agent for the GAA's first international tour to the US in 1888, which subsequently became known as the 'American Invasion'.

Another native of the village, Thomas St. George McCarthy (1862–1943), a police officer, was one of the Co-founders of the Gaelic Athletic Association.  He was one of the four Tipperary men who were among the seven who attended the inaugural meeting of the Association at Hayes' Hotel, Thurles on 1 November 1884. He was educated at Tipperary Grammar School (The Abbey School), Tipperary Town where he learned the rudiments of rugby football. He moved to Dublin in 1877 and became a friend of Michael Cusack, who had a cramming school. He was coached by Cusack for a Royal Irish Constabulary (RIC) cadetship examination in 1882, in which he took first place.  In 1881, he joined Trinity College Rugby Club and in January 1882, he played rugby for Ireland against Wales, thus becoming Bansha's first Rugby International player - the second Bansha native to gain international honours was Pierce O'Brien-Butler of Bansha Castle who played with Monkstown in South Dublin and won 6 caps from 1897 to 1902 before departing for the Boer war where he died of an illness.  Later in 1882, McCarthy won a Leinster Senior Cup medal with Dublin University (Trinity) Rugby Club.  It is supposed that his friendship with Michael Cusack led to his presence at the inaugural meeting of the Association.  At the time, he was a District Inspector of the RIC, based in nearby Templemore. He took a less prominent part in the affairs of the Association thereafter, although he was a frequent attender at Croke Park to where he travelled from his home in the Dublin suburb of Ranelagh where he lived. He died in 1943 and is buried in Dean's Grange Cemetery in South Dublin, though his sister, Kathleen McCarthy, is interred in the old village graveyard in Bansha. A graveside monument was raised in his honour by the Association in recent years at which representatives of the police forces, north and south of the Irish border were present as a reconciliatory gesture in a sporting context. 
   
In the past, Thomas was often mistaken as being a native of County Kerry.  This was due to his name being near identical with that of his father, George McCarthy (1832–1902), Lieutenant of the Revenue Police, County Inspector of the RIC and a resident magistrate who was from County Kerry, though working in County Tipperary and residing in Bansha village, where his son was born and grew up.

Notable players

The Galtee Rovers club has had a presence on many Tipperary teams throughout the years ranging in all grades and in both codes. Between 1975 and 1981, these included footballers such as Vincent O' Donnell, Seamus McCarthy, Jerry O'Connell, Jimmy Ferris, Séamus Grogan, Paddy Morrissey, Michael McCarthy and Michael Hickey. Vincent O'Donnell won a railway cup medal in 1978. Through the decades, the Club has supplied the County Senior Football team with players, such as Larry Maher in the late 1940s and early 1950s, to be followed by tean McGovern whose innings lasted from a 10-year period up to the early 1960s. John O'Meara also figured on the Tipperary Team during this period, while playing mid-field with Paddy Fanning. Boxer Johnny Ferris was the Club's lone representative on the Tipperary Minor football team that won Munster honours in 1955 with the defeat of Kerry. He later went on to play in that year's All-Ireland Final where he played opposite Lar Foley, Dublin's famous full-back. His brother Paddy was ever-present from the early 1950s and was also a boxer.

Denis Walsh played for the team from 1949 onwards along with Jack and Denis Grogan, Liam and Seán Byrnes, Larry Quiinn, Jim O'Connor, Eddie McCarthy, John Joe Quirke, Jim O'Connor, Seán McIntyre, Johnny Quinn, Tim Curran, Tim Carey, Jack Grogan, Denis Grogan, John Marnane, Donie and Pad Joe O'Brien and Michael Marnane. The team won the County senior football championship in 1949/50 and qualified for four other finals in that period. Most of them were present at the Barrack field in Fethard for the 1953 Final when one of the most storied goal in the history of the championship was scored in a sequence of play which subsequently became known as the "charge of the light brigade" when about twelve Galtee Rovers players rushed the ball to the net in a concerted forward movement when all before them including about half the Ballingarry team was carried to the riggings. The early 1960s brought together a team who took West Divisional senior Football honours in 1962/63, while also winning a junior hurling title in 1960, under the captaincy of Matt Nugent. This team contained three veterans from the 1940s and 1950s in Larry Maher, Eddie McCarthy and Seán Byrnes, who were assisted by the younger members, John Marnane of Cappa, Tom "Toddy" O'Brien, Roger Roche, Paddy Doocey of Toureen and Tom O'Dwyer. Larry Roche was a defender in this era, who also made some appearances for Tipperary. Con "Sonny" Marnane kept his family represented as his brother John was part of the team a decade earlier. Des O'Brien was also part of that champion team, while Liam Cox, Simon Grace (better known for his hurling prowess) and John Fahy also assisted in those years as did John Moloney at corner-forward, whose brother Michael "McDuff" was mentor. These were the years when the  Lattin-Cullen team were to the fore and with whom the Rovers engaged in many West Finals in Golden and Séan Treacy Park, Tipperary. The late 1960s were relatively trophy-free, due in large part to the exploits of Lattin-Cullen, however this period brought the maturing of corner backs, Billy Marnane of Cappa and Michael Darcy of Dranganmore, who with Larry Roche between them at full-back, formed part of the defence until the early 1970s. Michael Darcy's twin brothers, Billy and Jim took on his mantle and were prominent in university competitions, representing UCD and UCC, respectively, in the Fitzgibbon Cup (Intervarsities Hurling Championship). Davy Russell, Pat McCarthy from west Clare and Fanning played for a number years following the departure of McGovern and O'Meara.

The 1970s saw players such as Neil Fleming, Conor Peters and Maurice Morrissey. Neil Fleming won a Munster minor hurling medal in 1973 after Tipperary had failed at this level for ten years. Pat and Liam Bergin of Cappa, who grew up under the tutelage of their neighbour and stylish defender, John Marnane were also coming into their own in those years. Cappa also gave Matthew Quinlan to the team in the 1960s, whose preference however was for hurling, which was also the preferred code of the Whyte brothers of Drangan, Paul and Patsy. The Grace family provided a number of players, starting with J.J. sterling goalkeeper on the junior hurling team of 1971 which won divisional honours and including the two Michaels, "Foxy" Michael and "Black" Michael. Villagers, Billy Whelan and Eamonn McCarthy were defenders in this period. Jimmy Lonergan of Toureen played as corner forward with John Joe Hayes of Ballough. Michael O'Connell of the Village was a forward around at that time. His father Seán kept goal in Galtees' first appearance in the Divisional senior Hurling final, as far back as 1941. John Ned and Paddy Lonergan, also wore the red and white of Galtee Rovers as well as being referees. John took charge of many West Divisional and County Board fixtures in the 1970s, as did his brother Paddy. Both were following in the club tradition forged in previous years by Larry Mullaney, Larry Quinn and John Moloney. Philip Quirke and Christy MaGarahan won a rare Munster Minor Football Championship in 1984, a team which was beaten by a Jim Stynes led Dublin outfit.  Galtee Rover's stalwart Pat Bergin captained Tipperary senior footballers in 1982, and in 1985 he went on to win an All-Ireland junior hurling medal with Tipperary, followed in 1991 by Chris Byron who played midfield to claim another All-Ireland junior hurling title for the premier county. Michael Collins won a Munster minor hurling medal in 1993 followed by Colin Morrissey who followed suit in 1997.

Galtee Rover's members have represented clubs in the United States, 1969 saw Seamus Quinn win a North American senior hurling championship for the famed Chicago GAA club Harry Bolands and in 1971 Simon Grace was goalkeeper on the team that claimed the Chicago senior hurling championship for the Bolands. David Morrissey followed suit some 35 years later to win the Chicago Senior hurling championship of 2006 in the same green and gold stripes of the Harry Bolands GAA club.

In more recent times, the Club has produced a galaxy of young stars such as Conor O' Sullivan who was corner back on the Tipperary minor team of 2011 which won the All-Ireland Minor Football Championship title for the first time in 77 years for the premier county. Colin and Pa Morrissey represented Tipperary at both senior and intermediate level in both codes with Colin winning an All-Ireland Intermediate Hurling Championship title in 2000. Mark Peters played full back for the successful Tipperary intermediate hurlers of 2002 winning a munster championship medal. David Morrissey won three Munster Minor Hurling Championship finals in a row with Tipperary in 2001,2002 & 2003 combining with his older brother Andrew to win the Munster Under-21 Hurling Championship final in 2004, David having also won colleges hurling Fitzgibbon Cup titles in 2005 & 2007 under the guidance of Davy Fitzgerald. Andrew continued his affiliation with the county lining out for the senior footballers from 2006 to 2015 winning Divisions 4 and Division 3  National League titles along the way, he followed his uncle Pat Bergin's footsteps and captained the Tipperary footballers in 2009.  2010 brought more inter-county success to the club with Shane Egan proving his worth in the Munster Under-21 Football Championship final against Kerry kicking two vital points in Tralee to put his team ahead by a point at the final whistle.

References

Bibliography
 The Complete Handbook of Gaelic Games (2005), Editor Des Donegan

External links
[http://galteerovers.ie
Tipperary GAA site
The Parish of Bansha & Kilmoyler
 Samuel Lewis' Topographical Dictionary of Ireland, 1837 - Dr. Jane Lyons, Dublin
 Tipperary GAA Roll of Honour

Gaelic games clubs in County Tipperary
Hurling clubs in County Tipperary
Gaelic football clubs in County Tipperary